Carsten Byhring (8 December 1918 – 5 April 1990) was a Norwegian actor. He is probably best known for playing Kjell in the Olsen Gang movies. He is the brother of actor Svein Byhring.

He died from cancer in Oslo at the age of 71, in 1990.

Selected filmography
 1949: Svendsen går videre
 1955: Hjem går vi ikke
 1956: Bjørnepatruljen
 1959: The Chasers
 1963: Freske fraspark
 1966: Før frostnettene
 1966: Hurra for Andersens!
 1968: Sus og dus på by'n
 1970: Skulle det dukke opp flere lik er det bare å ringe
 1972: Lukket avdeling
 1974: Bobby's War

Reference

External links

1918 births
1990 deaths
Norwegian male film actors
Deaths from cancer in Norway
Leonard Statuette winners
20th-century Norwegian male actors